John Pickett may refer to:

John Pickett (businessman) (born 1934), American businessman and ice hockey team board chairman
John Pickett (baseball) (1866–1922), American baseball player
John Coleman Pickett (1896–1983), American federal judge
John Pickett (canoeist) (born 1951), American sprint canoeist
John A. Pickett (born 1945), British chemist
John S. Pickett Jr. (1920–2014), American legislator and judge